Kate Sanchez (born 1988/1989) is an American politician and businesswoman who has served in the California State Assembly from the 71st district since 2023.

Biography 
Prior to taking office, Sanchez served as the vice president of American Ground Transportation.

The result of the election in the 71st district was unclear for several weeks; as late as December 2, three days before the legislature was sworn in, neither Sanchez nor her opponent, Temecula Mayor Matt Rahn, had secured victory.

State Assembly 
Sanchez introduced two bills shortly after taking office – the first, focused on crime and public safety, would prevent human trafficking cases from being handled by multiple prosecutors. The second focused on education. She was barred from joining the California Latino Legislative Caucus, which is only made up of Democrats. Sanchez says she is a Hispanic working mother.

Electoral history

References 

California Republicans
Hispanic and Latino American politicians
Hispanic and Latino American state legislators in California
Latino conservatism in the United States
People from San Diego County, California
Republican Party members of the California State Assembly
Women state legislators in California